René Berton (14 October 1924 – 17 December 2006) was a French racing cyclist. He rode in the 1950 Tour de France.

References

1924 births
2006 deaths
French male cyclists
Place of birth missing